Chung Ung (17 April 1928 – 23 December 2021) was a South Korean politician. A member of the Peace Democratic Party, he served in the National Assembly from 1988 to 1992.

Chung ung died in Seoul on 23 December 2021, at the age of 93.

References

1928 births
2021 deaths
20th-century South Korean politicians
Members of the National Assembly (South Korea)
Peace Democratic Party politicians
People from Suncheon